Bernadotte may refer to:

House of Bernadotte, the royal family of Sweden
Jean Baptiste Jules Bernadotte French Jacobin leader, later French Marshal, later King Charles XIV of Sweden and founder of the House of Bernadotte

People
Estelle Bernadotte (1904–1984), wife of Folke 
Folke Bernadotte (1895–1948), Swedish statesman
Bernadotte Perrin (1847–1920), American classicist
Bernadotte Everly Schmitt (1886–1969), American historian

Places in the United States
Bernadotte, Illinois
Bernadotte, Minnesota
Bernadotte Township, Fulton County, Illinois
Bernadotte Township, Nicollet County, Minnesota
Bernadotte Bridge, a historical bridge in Illinois

See also
 Bernadette (disambiguation)
 Bernadetta (disambiguation)